Cerebos Pacific Limited (CPL) was a company selling health supplements, food and coffee products across the Asia-Pacific region. Most of the company assets are now owned by Kraft Heinz which acquire them from Suntory Holdings in 2018.

History 

Cerebos Pacific Limited traces its name back to 1892 when George Weddell decided to mix calcium phosphate with salt and invented dry-pouring salt. The brand name 'Cerebos' was derived from 'Ceres' for the Roman goddess of wheat harvest, and 'os' from the French word for 'bone.'

Cerebos subsequently grew to include a wide range of food products, acquiring Brand & Company in 1959 and later acquired by Rank Hovis McDougall (RHM) in 1968.

Cerebos Pacific Limited was formed in 1981 and acquired all RHM subsidiaries in Asia Pacific in 1982. In 1990, Suntory Holdings Limited purchased RHM shares in Cerebos Pacific Limited. In 2012, Cerebos was delisted from SGX and became a wholly owned subsidiary of Suntory Holdings Limited until 2018 when its food and coffee division (including Cerebos brand name in Asia Pacific) was acquired by the Kraft Heinz Company. Suntory subsequently moved health supplements division (now under Brand's brand name) to Suntory Beverage & Food Asia Pte. Ltd. and CPL was deregistered from company register of Singapore.

Beginnings (1820s - 1920s)

Eastward expansion (1948 - 1967)

Consolidation and growth (1968 - 1997)

Growth and Kraft Heinz acquisition (1998 - 2018)

Divisions

Health Supplement Division 
In Asia, the Health Supplement Division manages Brand's liquid and tablet product ranges for consumers’ health and wellness needs. Other Brain-to-Body Wellness brands include Xu Pei and Hua Tuo. Skin and Beauty Wellness brands. Each of these brands has a wide range of products targeted at different segments. This division was not included in Kraft Heinz acquisition and instead moved by Suntory to Suntory Beverage & Food Asia Pte. Ltd..

Food & Coffee Division 
In Australasia, Cerebos is a sauce, spice and coffee manufacturing organisation. Based in Australia, the Food & Coffee Division products include gravies, sauces, pickles, herbs and spices, salt, pepper, food mixes, desserts and toppings, drinks and coffee marketed under brand names including Gravox, Fountain, Saxa and Gregg's.

Cerebos’ coffee products include a variety of fresh coffee and instant coffees, sold under brand names such as Robert Harris, Mocopan, Toby's Estate, Caffe L’affare and Gregg's. Most of this division was acquired by Kraft Heinz with the exception of fresh coffee division which became Suntory Coffee Australia.

See also 
 Gregg's
 SAXA
 Yeo Hiap Seng

References

External links

1981 establishments in Singapore
2018 disestablishments in Singapore
Food and drink companies established in 1981
Food and drink companies disestablished in 2018
Food and drink companies of Singapore
Kraft Heinz